Taor is a village in the municipality of Valjevo, Serbia. According to the 2011 census, the village has a population of 303.

History 

In the surrounding area there are numerous traces of ancient mining activities, including mining of copper and iron. In November 2019 it was announced that the remains of the Byzantine church were discovered close to the Taor Springs. Remains of the Early Byzantium-style church are part of the wider complex, with parts of small fortification and presumably a mining settlement being located for now. Remains from the Stone Age, Iron Age, Antiquity and Middle Ages have been found along the corridor.

Taor Springs 

The village is located on the Povlen mountain. One of the attraction of the Povlen are the "Taor Springs" (Taorska vrela). Beautiful cascades were used in many touristic brochures in the Former Yugoslavia. They are located at the village's hamlet of Donji Taor ("Lower Taor"). Majority of the location is covered in beech forests and the location is especially known for bear's garlic, which is abundant. It grows on the shady slopes and in the woods. An annual "Days of Bear's Garlic" festival has been established in 2015.

In the 1980s. when the Kosjerić waterworks was constructed, the springs were partially capped and transferred to town's water system. Though the project wasn't conducted fully as planned, it still harmed the cascades as during the droughty years, the water dries out completely. The area was placed under the preliminary protection, but on paper only. Locals were digging the tufa stones, ruining the waterfalls and the entire environment.

There were 12 watermills on the springs, but as of 2017, none of them are operational, with only a few still physically surviving. By 2019 only three derelict ones remained (Delićka, Drojićka and Pejina), but the fourth one, Pepića watermill, was fully restored and became operational in 2018.

References 

Populated places in Kolubara District